Badman Recording Co. is an independent label and production company located in Portland, Oregon, United States. Badman has released recordings by artists such as The Innocence Mission, My Morning Jacket, Mark Kozelek and Starfucker. The label is headed by the recording engineer, Dylan Magierek.

Current roster
The Bell
The Builders and the Butchers
Lisa Germano
Aina Haina
The Innocence Mission
Nyles Lannon
Lanterna
Lovers
Misc.
Don Peris (the innocence mission)

References

External links

Oregon record labels
Companies based in Portland, Oregon